The 1948 United States presidential election in Arizona took place on November 2, 1948, as part of the 1948 United States presidential election. State voters chose four representatives, or electors, to the Electoral College, who voted for president and vice president.

Arizona was won by incumbent President Harry S. Truman (D–Missouri), running with Senator Alben W. Barkley, with 53.79% of the popular vote, against Governor Thomas Dewey (R–New York), running with Governor Earl Warren, with 43.82% of the popular vote.

, this is the last election in which Yavapai County voted for a Democratic presidential candidate. Maricopa County, which voted straight Republican with Yavapai from 1952 to 2016, broke its streak in the 2020 election.

Coconino County would not vote Democratic again until 1992, Navajo County not until 1976, whilst Apache, Cochise, Mohave and Pima Counties would next vote Democratic for Lyndon Johnson in 1964. This is also the last election where a candidate carried every county in the state, as well as the last time a Democrat won the state with an outright majority. It is also the last time Arizona voted more Democratic than the nation as a whole. Arizona would vote Republican in every election thereafter except 1996 and 2020. Had Bob Dole won the state in 1996, Arizona would have the longest Republican voting streak for any state in recent political history.

Results

Results by county

References

Arizona
1948
1948 Arizona elections